Ledwa Mahua is a census town in Sant Kabir Nagar district in the Indian state of Uttar Pradesh.

Demographics
 India census, Ledwa Mahua had a population of 11,524. Males constitute 52% of the population and females 48%. Ledwa Mahua has an average literacy rate of 44%, lower than the national average of 59.5%: male literacy is 52%, and female literacy is 34%. In Ledwa Mahua, 22% of the population is under 6 years of age.

References

Cities and towns in Sant Kabir Nagar district